Petrovsky District is the name of several administrative and municipal districts in Russia. The districts' name generally derives from or is related to the male first name Pyotr.
Petrovsky District, Saratov Oblast, an administrative and municipal district of Saratov Oblast
Petrovsky District, Stavropol Krai, an administrative and municipal district of Stavropol Krai
Petrovsky District, Tambov Oblast, an administrative and municipal district of Tambov Oblast

See also
Petrovsky (disambiguation)

References